Candide is a French satire by the Enlightenment philosopher Voltaire.

Candide may also refer to:
 Candide (operetta), an operetta by Leonard Bernstein

People with the given name

 Candide Charkviani (1907–1994), Soviet Georgian politician
 Candide Rochefort (1904–1971), Quebec politician
 Candide Thovex (born 1982), French professional skier

Newspapers
 Candide (newspaper) Any of three newspapers of France of the 19th and 20th century

See also
 Candide, Part II, an apocryphal picaresque novel
 Candid (disambiguation)

French masculine given names
Masculine given names